Trevor Alec Jones (12 August 1924 – 20 March 1983) was a British Labour Party politician.

Jones was born in Clydach Vale and educated at Rhondda Boys' Grammar School. After obtaining a teaching qualification at Bangor Normal College, he taught from 1947 until 1967, when the death of the local MP, Iorwerth Thomas, whose political agent Jones had been, created a vacancy which resulted in his own selection.

Jones was Member of Parliament for Rhondda West from the 1967 Rhondda West by-election until the constituency was abolished in 1974, and for Rhondda from 1974 until he died in office shortly before the 1983 general election. He was a junior minister for Social Security from 1974 to 1975 and for Wales from 1975 to 1979.

Jones had suffered from a heart condition for some years prior to his death at the age of 58, which occurred at his home in Tonypandy.

References

Times Guide to the House of Commons 1979

External links 
 

1924 births
1983 deaths
Confederation of Health Service Employees-sponsored MPs
Welsh Labour Party MPs
UK MPs 1966–1970
UK MPs 1970–1974
UK MPs 1974
UK MPs 1974–1979
UK MPs 1979–1983
Members of the Privy Council of the United Kingdom